Albert William Addinall (30 January 1921 – May 2005) was an English professional footballer. He scored 92 goals from 222 games in the Football League playing for Queens Park Rangers, Brighton & Hove Albion and Crystal Palace as a centre forward.

Career
Addinall was born in Marylebone, London. He joined Queens Park Rangers in April 1945 from British Oxygen. His league debut came in September 1946 in the 3–0 win against AFC Bournemouth and he went on to play 150 league games scoring 59 goals.

Addinall left QPR for Brighton & Hove Albion in January 1953, where he was again a regular goalscorer. He moved to Crystal Palace in July 1954, playing twelve league games, before ending his league career. He went on to play non-League football for Snowdown Colliery Welfare. Addinall died in May 2005.

References

External links

1921 births
2005 deaths
Footballers from Marylebone
English footballers
Association football forwards
Queens Park Rangers F.C. players
Brighton & Hove Albion F.C. players
Crystal Palace F.C. players
English Football League players
Snowdown Colliery Welfare F.C. players